Coping Mechanisms is the second studio album by American singer-songwriter Tayla Parx. It was released on November 20, 2020, through Atlantic Records.

Track listing 
Coping Mechanisms track listing

References 

2020 albums
Pop albums by American artists
Atlantic Records albums